Fien Delbaere (born 21 April 1996) is a Belgian professional racing cyclist, who currently rides for UCI Women's Continental Team .

See also
 List of 2015 UCI Women's Teams and riders

References

External links

1996 births
Living people
Belgian female cyclists
Place of birth missing (living people)
Sportspeople from Ghent
Cyclists from East Flanders
21st-century Belgian women